Sanderia pampinosus is a disc jellyfish in the family Pelagiidae from seas off northern Australia.

References 

Animals described in 2008
Pelagiidae